The Maiden Tower is a 12th-century monument in the Old City, Baku, Azerbaijan. Along with the Shirvanshahs' Palace, dated to the 15th century, it forms a group of historic monuments listed in 2001 under the UNESCO World Heritage List of Historical Monuments as cultural property, Category III. It is one of Azerbaijan's most distinctive national emblems, and is thus featured on Azerbaijani currency notes and official letterheads.

The Maiden Tower houses a museum, which presents the story of the historic evolution of Baku city. It also has a gift shop. The view from the roof takes in the alleys and minarets of the Old City, the Baku Boulevard, the house of Isa bek Hajinski and a wide vista of the Baku Bay.

The Tower is covered by cloud of mysteries and legends which are rooted to the history and culture of Azerbaijan. Indeed, some epics became a subject for scenario for ballets and theatre's plays. The Maiden Tower (ballet) is a world-class Azerbaijani ballet created by Afrasiyab Badalbeyli in 1940 and ballet's remake was performed in 1999.

Consequent to the receding of the sea shoreline of the Caspian Sea, a strip of land emerged. This land was developed between the 9th and 15th centuries, when the walls of the old city, the palace including the huge bastion of the Maiden Tower were built.

History

Some scientific sources indicate that the Maiden Tower is a paramount example of Zoroastrianism and the pre-Islamic architecture in Iran and Azerbaijan. Prof Davud A.Akhundov provides archeological and architectural evidences and argues that the Tower is Zoroastrians' Fire temple-Tower which had 7 fire exits on the top of the tower. Zoroastrian believed that there are 7 Steps or 7 Sky to reach heaven.

Davud A.Akhundov and Hassan Hassanov date the fire temple-tower approximately as 8th-7th century B.C.

The Maiden Tower set in the south-east part of Icheri Sheher, has mystique and hoary history and legends that are linked to two periods, though not conclusively established. The area was first settled in the Palaeolithic period.

Sara Ashurbeyli, Professor and prominent historian and expert in the history of Baku has calculated that the tower foundations, which extend 15 metres below ground level and the bottom three stories above ground, were originally built between the 4th and 6th centuries CE and points out the marked difference in the stone used in the tower compared to the stone used in the medieval city surrounding it. This conclusion is partly supported by historian Prof Bretanitskiy who has postulated that the tower was partly built in the 5th to 6th centuries and then later in the 12th century. The site was believed to have been used originally during the Sasanid era as a Zoroastrian temple. An inscription located 14 metres high on the south wall which in old Kufic script mentions Qubbeye Masud ibn Davud or Kubey Mesud ibn Da’ud, an architect active during the 12th century; he is the father of the architect who built the Mardakan Round Tower. However it is disputed as the inscription, unlike the Mardakan Tower inscription, does not actually reveal him to have been the architect, although it is generally agreed that much of the modern tower dates back to the 12th century. Prof. Ahmadov believes that the tower was used as an astronomical observatory from the time of this reconstruction, due to the fact that 30 hewed stone protuberances on the tower's lower section and the 31 protuberances on the upper section, linked with a stone belt, correlate to the days of the month.

According to recent archaeological excavations, carried out in 1962–63 on the ground floor of the tunnel, the tower was built on a large rock sloping toward the sea, and the buttress structure projecting out from the main tower provided stability to the tower. This has been inferred as an earthquake-resistant design. It is also mentioned that the tower was built at one go and not at different times as inferred by other scholars.

The tower and other wall structures now under the UNESCO list were strengthened during the Russian rule in 1806 and have survived.

The Maiden Tower is depicted on the obverse of the Azerbaijani 1 to 250 manat banknotes of 1992–2006, and of the 10 manat banknote issued since 2006, as well as on the obverse of the Azerbaijani 50 qəpik coin minted between 1992 and 2006 and the reverse 5 qəpik coin minted since 2006.

Legends and mysteries
There are various mysteries and legends related to Baku Maiden Tower. However, the main mystery is the Tower's design and purpose. Meanwhile, there are up to 20 legends related to Baku Maiden Tower. A large number of them are connected to the Islamic and Medieval period of Baku's history. But others are rooted deeply in Azerbaijan's Zoroastrian or pre-Islamic history, religion, and culture. Probably, the most famous legend is that of the fiery-haired virgin girl who saved Baku's people from slavery. The epic shows roots to Azerbaijan's Zoroastrian beliefs and culture and has reached down to modern times.

The legend of the fiery-haired girl

Once upon a time, there was an ancient town-fortress of Baku. The fortress had a Fire Temple-Tower. In very ancient times, an enemy encircled the fortress. The enemy ordered Baku's people to surrender but they refused. So the enemy launched a siege to demolish the fortress and capture all inhabitants as slaves. Many fortress' defenders died trying to stop enemy attacks. Meanwhile, the enemy's commander ordered the water supply lines to be cut. So everybody was thirsty inside the fortress. No water no food, only blood, and death. And the Supreme Magi, together with other priests, prayed to the Holy Fire in the fortress' Fire Temple-Tower, asking the God of Ahura Mazda to help the people. They prayed day and night asking Ahura Mazda to save their life and to push the enemy back. Finally, he heard their prayers. On the next day, the people saw a large piece of the Holy Fire fell down from the top of the Fire Temple-Tower. A beautiful girl came out from the fire. She had long fire-colored hairs. The crowd went down on their knees and started to pray to her. She said: "no worries. I'll help and protect you. Give me sword and helmet. The enemy should not see my girl's hairs, open a fortress' gate". Meanwhile, the enemy's commander was waiting outside for the fortress' pahlevan for one-to-one fight. If the fortress' pahlevan wins the fight, then the enemy's army has to move back away. But if the enemy win, so they have to capture the fortress and all surviving inhabitants must be slaves. The fortress' gate was opened and the enemy's commander saw one pahlevan is coming to fight. Thus, the heavy battle began. In one of God's blessed moments, the fortress' pahlevan unhorsed the enemy and put a knife direct to his neck. The enemy's commander screamed: "You win! Who are you? Take your helmet off. I want to see your face, pahlevan!" He took off the helmet and saw that the fortress' pahlevan is a beautiful girl with long fire-colored hairs. He exclaimed: "Oh, you are a girl! You are a brave and beautiful girl! If girls of Baku are so brave, I'll never size your fortress! Don't kill me, beauty!" He fell in love with her for her beauty and bravery. He asked her to marry him. Of course, the girl did not kill him. She fell in love with him too for his open heart. Thus, the enemy did not capture Baku and the local people named a tower as the Maiden tower.

The legend of why Baku tower's fires stopped burning
The next legend indicates Zoroastrian roots as well:

Once upon a time, an enemy besieged the fortress of Baku. However, Baku's people refused the enemy's request to surrender. They decided to fight to the end and to defend their lives and fortress. So Baku's people fought with a great bravery but the situation inside the fortress became more and more perilous. The enemy implemented a tight siege to overthrow the defenders. The enemy cut the water supply. With no water and food, the defenders did not have any chance of survival. Meanwhile, Supreme Magi with other priests prayed in the fortress' Holy Fire Temple-Tower. All together, they prayed to God of Ahura Mazda asking him to help them. After several days of non-stop praying, He heard priests' blessings and prayers. A strong and devastating earthquake occurred. Thousand of enemies perished and, as a result, survived enemies ran away. Thus, the people of Baku escaped slavery but the Holy Fires were stopped on the top of the Fire Temple-Tower.

Source of the name "Maiden Tower"

Professor Mahir Khalifa-zadeh believes that apart from legends, it has been difficult to find historical explanations or archaeological or written evidence as to why the tower was called the Maiden Tower. In addition to epical backgrounds, it is believable that the word "maiden" means that the tower was not destroyed by any enemy and thus means (from the religious viewpoint) that it was never desecrated (touched) by the evil of Angra Mainyu and remains the "virgin" or "maiden" temple-tower of the Zoroastrianian God, Ahura Mazda.

Architecture

The tower has been described as the "most majestic and mysterious monument of Baku, the Gyz Galasy", built on solid rock foundation, demonstrates right on the coast line, a fusion of Arabic, Persian and Ottoman influences. It was constructed alongside a natural oil well. The internal space available in the tower is said to be adequate to accommodate 200 people. A long solid projection to the main tower faces east, which is oriented towards sunrise pointing to the equinoxes, which has led to the conclusion that it was built as an astronomical tower; while the buttress faces east, the door access to the tower faces southeast. Each floor of the tower has a shallow vaulted roof, "a stone cupola" that has a central opening. All floors are connected by staircase which abuts the circular wall and are lighted by narrow windows or niches which flare inward. The structure built in stone masonry exhibits varying finished surfaces, which is inlaid with local grey limestone. The alternate courses of stone laid in gypsum plaster gives a black and white banded effect. The northwestern part of the tower retains the original surface finish. There is also a beak-like projection, a buttress, curved in shape, made in masonry. The earliest stonework has square corners.

A detailed examination of the construction features of the tower by archaeologists suggests that the stone masonry, both on its interior and exterior surfaces, is diamond-shaped and is seen at the top as well as at the bottom of the tower wall. The diamond-shaped cut seen as a decorative feature, particularly on the outer face of the west side wall, is ornate at the top and plain at the bottom of the wall; a subtle feature noted throughout the tower suggests that it was built as one monolith unit at one period. However, the recent renovations are stated to be crude.

Water Well
It has an entrance also at the ground level which was discovered by Archaeologist Abbas Islamov during a recent study of the tower. This well has been interpreted as a rainwater harvesting structure and the water is said to be clean and fresh (though close to the sea). The ceramic pipe ( in diameter) plumbing seen running down from the niches of the tower into the well was meant as a supply source. Since the ancient plumbing system is said to be in its original form, it needs to be cleaned and its layout ascertained by further studies to describe the drainage network that was originally built as part of the tower. The ceramics of the plumbing system and the silt deposited in them could also help to fix the age of the tower by using thermo-luminescence technique.

Also seen in the tower, between the 2nd floor and the 7th floor, is a gutter of semicircular shape at every floor. It is made of ceramic pipes fitted one above another and joined by lime mortar. The pipes are presumably produced with the potter's wheel technique. Similar gutters are seen from the ground floor up to the foundation level but with the four-cornered ceramic pipes of  ×  size, which run outside through the wall.

Restoration
Subsequent to the declaration of the entire cultural property including the tower and the city walls as a UNESCO World Heritage Site, an earthquake in 2000 caused damage to the property. UNESCO, noting the lack of efforts by the national authorities to adequately conserve this cultural heritage then listed these monuments under the "List of World Heritage in Danger," from 2004 to 2009 with the comment "Loss of authenticity due in part to the earthquake in 2000 and to the urban development pressures." However, after the concerned authorities evolved a Conservation Master Plan and assured of adequate conservation and management of the property, the "in danger" tag attached to the heritage site has been removed by UNESCO in 2009. It was also requested that the State Party would submit to the World Heritage Centre, by 1 February 2010, an updated report on the state of conservation of the property and progress made for consideration by the World Heritage Committee at its 34th session in 2010.

In 2011–2013 the tower underwent a restoration. At that time, in 2011, plexiglass barriers were installed around the tower's observation deck to prevent suicides.

In popular culture
The legendary tale of the king willing to force his daughter to marry a man she doesn't love, which she escapes by asking her father to first build a tower for her, and when it is finished committing suicide by jumping from the top of it has been the subject of many Azerbaijani poems and plays. The ballet titled “Maiden Tower", was the first Azerbaijani ballet composed by Afrasiyyab Badalbayli, in 1940. This ballet is performed at Baku's Opera and Ballet Theatre. However, the storyline is a modified version of the legend. According to the modified version of the Ballet, the king on his return from his war campaign found that his wife had given birth to a daughter instead of a son. He became furious and ordered the killing of his baby daughter. However, the baby's nanny took her away to a secret place where she grew up to a beautiful lady. At age seventeen she got engaged to a lover. At this juncture, the king chanced to see her, wanted to marry her and therefore took her away and kept her in the Maiden Tower. The girl's lover was furious with this turn of events and he managed to kill the king. He then ran to the Maiden Tower to rescue his lover. However, when the girl heard the sound of footsteps approaching the tower, she thought that it was the king coming to see her and she immediately committed suicide by jumping down from the tower.

As of 2011, the tower also participates in "Earth Hour," a campaign against climate change in which large buildings "go dark" for an hour to draw awareness to the cause.

Picture gallery

See also
 Gobustan Rock Art Cultural Landscape
 Fire Temple of Baku
 List of World Heritage Sites in Azerbaijan

References

External links

 Walled City of Baku with the Shirvanshah's Palace and Maiden Tower UNESCO collection on Google Arts and Culture
 Secrets of the Maiden Tower. Azerbaijan International (Autumn 2006)
 Baku's Maiden Tower from Azerbaijan International
 The Legend Of Baku Maiden Tower (Zoroastrian legends)

Buildings and structures in Baku
Towers in Azerbaijan
World Heritage Sites in Azerbaijan
Tourist attractions in Baku
Monuments and memorials in Azerbaijan
National symbols of Azerbaijan
Castles and fortresses in Azerbaijan
Icherisheher